Zlazne is a village in Rivne Raion, Rivne Oblast, Ukraine, but was formerly administered within Kostopil Raion. In 2001, the community had 1593 residents. Its postal code is 35040.

References 

Villages in Rivne Raion